Gijsbertus "Ben" Verhagen  (29 September 1926 – 4 January 2020)  was a sailor from the Netherlands, who represented his country at the 1960 Summer Olympics in Naples. Verhagen, as helmsman on the Dutch Flying Dutchman Daisy (H102), took 5th place with crew Gerard Lautenschutz (race 1–5) and Jaap Helder (Race 6&7). During the 1964 Summer Olympics in Naples and 1968 Summer Olympics in Acapulco he again helmed Daisy (H157/H187), this time with Nick de Jong, and finished in 6th and 18th place, respectively.

For the 1976 Olympics Verhagen made an attempt in the Tempest but failed to qualify. He also tried the Soling in the late 1970s and the 1980s.

Sources

 
 
 
 
 
 
 
 
 
 
 
 
 
 
 
 
 
 
 
 
 
 
 

1926 births
2020 deaths
Sportspeople from Rotterdam
Dutch male sailors (sport)
Tempest class sailors
Soling class sailors
Sailors at the 1960 Summer Olympics – Flying Dutchman
Sailors at the 1964 Summer Olympics – Flying Dutchman
Sailors at the 1968 Summer Olympics – Flying Dutchman
Olympic sailors of the Netherlands